This is a round-up of the 1970 Sligo Senior Football Championship. St. Patrick's, Dromard claimed their second title, as they embarked on their dominance of Sligo football in the early seventies. Mullinabreena were the beaten finalists, making their last appearance in a Senior final.

First round

Quarter-finals

Semi-finals

Sligo Senior Football Championship Final

References

 Sligo Champion (Autumn 1970)

Sligo Senior Football Championship
Sligo